Viktor Stanislavovich Korchagin (born 7 August 1967 in Novy Afon, GSSR, Soviet Union) is a Russian ski-orienteering competitor and world champion. He received a gold medal in the long distance at the 1998 World Ski Orienteering Championships in Windischgarsten.

References

Living people
Russian orienteers
Male orienteers
Ski-orienteers
Mountain bike orienteers
1967 births